Saraswatipur High School a secondary school in Mahadebpur Upazila of Naogaon District, Bangladesh. It was established in 1963.

References

Schools in Naogaon District
High schools in Bangladesh
1964 establishments in East Pakistan